Václav Verner (1949-2018) was an international speedway rider.

Speedway career
He was the individual champion of Czechoslovakia, after winning the Czechoslovakian Championship in 1971, finished runner-up five time (1970, 1976, 1977, 1978, 1980) and third twice (1975, 1981).

He rode in the top tier of British Speedway for Exeter Falcons and Poole Pirates.

World Final Appearances

Individual World Championship
 1980 -  Göteborg, Ullevi - Reserve - did not ride
 1982 -  Los Angeles Memorial Coliseum - 15th - 2pts
 1984 -  Göteborg, Ullevi - 16th - 0pts

World Pairs Championship
 1970 -  Malmö, Malmö Stadion (with Jiří Štancl) - 5th - 11pts (5)
 1971 -  Rybnik, Rybnik Municipal Stadium (with Pavel Mareš) - 4th - 17pts (9)

World Team Cup
 1970 -  London, Wembley Stadium (with Zdeněk Majstr / Jiří Štancl / Miloslav Verner / Jan Holub) - 4th - 3pts (3)
 1977 -  Wrocław, Olympic Stadium (with Jiří Štancl / Jan Verner / Aleš Dryml) - 3rd - 23pts (5)
 1978 -  Landshut, Ellermühle Stadium (with Jiří Štancl / Jan Verner / Aleš Dryml) - 4th - 16+2pts (2)
 1979 -  London, White City Stadium (with Zdeněk Kudrna / Aleš Dryml / Jiří Štancl) - 3rd - 19pts (4)
 1980 -  Wrocław, Olympic Stadium (with Zdeněk Kudrna / Aleš Dryml / Jiří Štancl / Petr Ondrašík) - 4th - 12pts (3)
 1982 -  London, White City Stadium (with Aleš Dryml / Jiří Štancl / Petr Ondrašík / Antonín Kasper Jr.) - 4th - 17pts (6)
 1983 -  Vojens, Speedway Center (with Aleš Dryml / Jiří Štancl / Antonín Kasper Jr. / Petr Ondrašík) - 4th - 3pts (1)

Individual Ice Speedway World Championship
1973  Inzell, 16th – 3pts
1984  Moscow, 15th

Family
His brother Jan Verner and cousin Miloslav Verner were also international speedway riders.

Death
Verner died in 2018 after a long illness.

References

1949 births
2018 deaths
Czech speedway riders
Poole Pirates riders
Exeter Falcons riders
Sportspeople from Prague